William Adamson (2 April 1863 – 23 February 1936) was a Scottish trade unionist and Labour politician. He was Leader of the Labour Party from 1917 to 1921 and served as Secretary of State for Scotland in 1924 and during 1929–1931 in the first two Labour ministries headed by Ramsay MacDonald.

Background
Adamson was born in Dunfermline, Fife, and was educated at a local dame school. He worked as a miner in Fife where he became involved with the National Union of Mineworkers. In 1902–08 he was Assistant Secretary of the Fife and Kinross Miners' Association, and he thereafter served as its General Secretary.

Political career

Active with the new Labour Party, Adamson was first elected to Parliament for West Fife in the December 1910 general election. His victory was the only Labour gain from the Liberals in that election.

Adamson was elected Chairman of the Parliamentary Labour Party on 24 October 1917, a post he held until 1921. He led the party into the general election of 1918, which saw Labour gain 15 seats and become the largest opposition party in the House of Commons for the first time; however, there remained uncertainty as to whether Adamson or the leader of the independent Liberals, Donald Maclean could claim to be the true leader of the opposition in the Commons.

In 1918 he was sworn into the Privy Council.  In 1919, Adamson was confident that the experience of the First World War would "produce a different atmosphere and an entirely different relationship amongst all sections of our people" and would act as a watershed in the process of social reform.  He served as Secretary for Scotland and Secretary of State for Scotland in 1924 and between 1929 and 1931 in the Labour governments of Ramsay MacDonald.

However, he split with MacDonald after the formation of the National Government. Adamson lost his seat in the 1931 election which he contested for Labour against MacDonald's coalition. He stood again in the 1935 election but again failed to take the seat, losing on this occasion to William Gallacher of the Communist Party of Great Britain.

Personal life

Adamson was married to Christina Myles Marshall (1862–1935), a factory worker, with whom he had two daughters and two sons; one of the latter was killed during the First World War.

Adamson died in February 1936, aged 72. He is buried in Dunfermline Cemetery, just north of the roundel at the end of the entrance avenue.

References

Torrance, David, The Scottish Secretaries (Birlinn 2006)

External links            
 

1863 births
1936 deaths
Scottish Labour MPs
Politicians from Dunfermline
British Secretaries of State
Leaders of the Labour Party (UK)
Members of the Privy Council of the United Kingdom
Members of the Parliament of the United Kingdom for Fife constituencies
Miners' Federation of Great Britain-sponsored MPs
Scottish Baptists
UK MPs 1910–1918
UK MPs 1918–1922
UK MPs 1922–1923
UK MPs 1923–1924
UK MPs 1924–1929
UK MPs 1929–1931
20th-century Scottish politicians